White heather may refer to:

 Cassiope tetragona known by common names white Arctic mountain heather and Arctic white heather
 Cassiope mertensiana known by common name white mountain heather
 White forms of Calluna vulgaris
 The White Heather, a 1919 film, based on a play of the same name
 The White Heather (play), an 1897 play
 A blended whisky by Chivas Brothers containing malt whisky from Glenallachie distillery
 The White Heather Club, a Scottish TV programme